is a mountain in the Kitami Mountains. It is located on the border of Bifuka, Otoineppu and Esashi, Hokkaidō, Japan.

Mount Hako is made from mafic non-alkali rock from 15 to 7 million years old.

References

 Geographical Survey Institute

Mountains of Hokkaido